John Lewis Munce (November 18, 1857 – March 15, 1917) was a Major League Baseball player.

He was born and died in Philadelphia, Pennsylvania.

External links

1857 births
1917 deaths
Major League Baseball outfielders
Wilmington Quicksteps players
Baseball players from Pennsylvania
19th-century baseball players
Wilmington Quicksteps (minor league) players
Baltimore Monumentals (minor league) players
Portland (minor league baseball) players
Haverhill (minor league baseball) players